This is a list of lesbian, gay, and bisexual, and transgender (LGBT) Spaniards who have served in the Spanish Cortes Generales, the Spanish government or the regional parliaments.

 30 members of the LGBT community are known to have held office in the Spanish Cortes Generales. In the Congress, 24 LGBT people held office; in the Senate, 12 held office. Five people, Jerónimo Saavedra, Miriam Blasco, Antonio Hurtado, María Freixanet, Javier Maroto and Jesús Vázquez have served in both Chambers. The earliest known LGBT congressperson was Jerónimo Saavedra, who is also the earliest known openly LGBT senator, although he was not out during his tenure as deputy. The earliest openly LGBT deputy is therefore Ernesto Gasco.  10 openly LGBT members of the 14th Congress: 5 of them belong to the Spanish Socialist Workers' Party or the Socialists' Party of Catalonia, two of them belong to the Unidas Podemos coalition, one belongs to the People's Party, one belongs to Navarra Suma and one belongs to the Catalan European Democratic Party; and four openly LGBT senators, three from the People's Party and one from the Spanish Socialist Workers' Party.

Senate 
All senators listed served as open members of the LGBT community unless otherwise specified:

Congress of Deputies 
All deputies listed served as open members of the LGBT community unless otherwise specified:

Government 

In addition, several members of the Spanish government, present in the Spanish Cortes Generales but without right to vote, have belonged to the LGBT community.

All ministers listed served as open members of the LGBT community unless otherwise specified:

Andalusian Parliament

Aragonese Corts

Basque Parliament

Canarian Parliament

Cortes of Castile-La Mancha

Cortes of Castile and León

Extremaduran Assembly

General Junta of the Principality of Asturias

Madrid Assembly

Parliament of Cantabria

Parliament of Catalonia

Parliament of Galicia

Parliament of La Rioja

Parliament of Navarre

Parliament of the Balearic Islands

Regional Assembly of Murcia

Valencian Corts

Mayors

See also 
 LGBT rights in Spain

References 

Spain